Carmen Giménez (born February 20, 1971 in New York City) is an American poet, writer, and editor.

Life
Giménez earned a Bachelor of Arts from San José State University and a Master of Fine Arts from the Iowa Writers' Workshop, where she was a Teaching-Writing Fellow. She was recently a professor in English at Virginia Polytechnic Institute and State University and, prior to that, New Mexico State University. She teaches in Bennington College's Master of Fine Arts Program in Creative Writing. Giménez is the founder and publisher of Noemi Press, and she is a founding fellow and co-director of CantoMundo. In the fall of 2017, Giménez became editor of The Nation's Poetry Section, alongside Stephanie Burt. In summer of 2022, Giménez became the Executive Director and Publisher of Graywolf Press.

In 2009, Giménez was named to  Poetry Society of America's biennial New American Poets Series. In 2011, she was named a Howard Foundation Fellow in Creative Nonfiction; her memoir, Bring Down the Little Birds, received an American Book Award; and her third collection of poems, Goodbye, Flicker, was awarded the Juniper Prize for Poetry.  Milk and Filth was a finalist for the 2013 National Book Critics Circle Award for Poetry. Her 2019 poetry collection Be Recorder was a finalist for the National Book Award for Poetry, the PEN/Open Book Award, the Audre Lorde Award for Lesbian Poetry, and the Los Angeles Times Book Prize.

Awards
 2009  Poetry Society of America's New American Poets Series
 2011 Juniper Prize for Poetry
 2011 American Book Award
 2011–2012 Howard Foundation Fellowship in Creative Nonfiction
 2013 National Book Critics Circle Award (Poetry) shortlist for Milk and Filth
 2019 National Book Award for Poetry finalist for Be Recorder
2019 John Simon Guggenheim Fellowship

Books

Poetry collections
Be Recorder (Minneapolis, Graywolf Press, 2019). 
 Cruel Futures: City Lights Spotlight Series No. 17 (City Lights, 2018) 
 Milk and Filth (Tucson, The University of Arizona Press, 2013). 
 Goodbye, Flicker (Amherst, University of Massachusetts Press, 2012). 
 The City She Was (Ft. Collins, Center for Literary Publishing, 2011). 
Odalisque in Pieces (Tucson, University of Arizona Press, 2009).

Memoir
 Bring Down the Little Birds (Tucson, University of Arizona Press, 2010).

Edited anthologies 
 Angels of the Americlypse : an anthology of new Latin@ writing, edited with John Chavez (Denver: Counterpath, 2014).
 My Mother She Killed Me, My Father He Ate Me, edited with Kate Bernheimer (New York: Penguin, 2010).

Chapbooks
 Jokey Poems Up to Ten (Zurich, Dusie Kollectiv, 2013)
 Can We Talk Here (New York, Belladonna Books, 2011)
 Reason's Monster (Zurich, Dusie Kollectiv, 2011)
 Glitch (Zurich, Dusie Kollectiv, 2010)

References

External links
 Author site
 Featured in Poetry Society of America's New American Poets Series
 Biography at the Poetry Foundation
"NewsPoet: Carmen Gimenez Smith's Day In Verse", NPR, May 21, 2012

Carmen Giménez Smith recorded for the literary archive in the Hispanic Division at  the Library of Congress on February 14, 2014.

1971 births
Living people
21st-century American memoirists
American people of Peruvian descent
American women poets
Ashland University faculty
Hispanic and Latino American poets
Iowa Writers' Workshop alumni
New Mexico State University faculty
San Jose State University alumni
American Book Award winners
21st-century American poets
American women memoirists
American women academics
21st-century American women writers